The popliteal fossa (also referred to as hough,[1] or kneepit in analogy to the cubital fossa) is a shallow depression located at the back of the knee joint. The bones of the popliteal fossa are the femur and the tibia. Like other flexion surfaces of large joints (groin, armpit, cubital fossa and essentially the anterior part of the neck), it is an area where blood vessels and nerves pass relatively superficially, and with an increased number of lymph nodes.

Structure

Boundaries
The boundaries of the fossa are:

Roof
Moving from superficial to deep structures, the roof is formed by:
 the skin.
 the superficial fascia. This contains the small saphenous vein, the terminal branch of the posterior cutaneous nerve of the thigh, posterior division of the medial cutaneous nerve, lateral sural cutaneous nerve, and medial sural cutaneous nerve.
 the popliteal fascia.

Floor
The floor is formed by:
 the popliteal surface of the femur.
 the capsule of the knee joint and the oblique popliteal ligament.
 strong fascia covering the popliteus muscle.

Contents
Structures within the popliteal fossa include, (from superficial to deep):
 tibial nerve
common fibular nerve (also known as the common peroneal nerve)
 popliteal vein
 popliteal artery, a continuation of the femoral artery
 small saphenous vein (termination)
 Popliteal lymph nodes and vessels

It is of note that the common fibular nerve also begins at the superior angle of the popliteal fossa.

Additional images

See also
 Hamstring

References

External links

 
 

Lower limb anatomy
Knee